Awad Al-Anazi (born 24 September 1968) is a Saudi Arabian football defender who played for Saudi Arabia in the 1994 FIFA World Cup. He also played for Al-Shabab Riyadh.

References

1968 births
Saudi Arabian footballers
Saudi Arabia international footballers
Association football defenders
Al-Shabab FC (Riyadh) players
1992 King Fahd Cup players
1992 AFC Asian Cup players
1994 FIFA World Cup players
Living people
Saudi Professional League players